Simbach (Inn) station is a railway station in the municipality of Simbach am Inn, located in the Rottal-Inn district in Bavaria, Germany.

References

Railway stations in Bavaria
Buildings and structures in Rottal-Inn